Aqdasiyeh (also Romanized as Āqdasīyeh) is a village in Chahardangeh Rural District, Chaharbagh District, Savojbolagh County, Alborz Province, Iran. At the 2006 census, its population was 17, in 6 families.

References 

Populated places in Savojbolagh County